The Fengon 500 is a subcompact crossover SUV produced since 2019 by the Fengon (Fengguang) brand of Chinese car manufacturer DFSK Motor, a joint venture between Dongfeng Motor and Sokon Group. In export markets it is sold as DFSK Glory E3 and Seres 3.

Overview 
On sale from November 2020, the Fengon 500 is the version powered by an internal combustion engine of 1.5 liters naturally aspirated petrol with multiplint injection delivering 116 horsepower with a 5-speed manual gearbox or CVT made by Punch Powertrain. It is exported out of China renamed DFSK Glory 500. The ICE version equipped with a 1.5 liter petrol engine was called Fengon 500 in China and Glory 500 in the export market.

The interior features fully functional instrumentation combined with the 10.5-inch touchscreen multimedia system with Baidu Apollo system.

Variants

Fengon E3 EV 
The electric variant of the Fengon 500 is called the Fengon E3. The mechanics of the E3 are derived from the compact crossover Fengon ix5 but with a shorter wheelbase. Front suspension use a MacPherson strut and rear suspension uses a torsion beam semi independent strut.
Presented at the Shanghai 2019 motor show in the electric version sold as Fengon E3 EV, it is the first compact SUV produced by DFSK as well as the cheapest model. The body has a length of 4,385 mm, 1,850 mm wide and 1,647 mm high with a wheelbase of 2655 mm (more compact than the Fengon/Glory 580). Aesthetically, it presents the new family feeling common to the Fengon ix5 crossover coupé.

The E3 EV has a three-phase asynchronous electric motor delivering 120 kW and 300 Nm of torque combined with a 53.6 kWh lithium pherophospate battery with a range (NEDC) of 405 km.

In export markets it is sold as DFSK Glory E3 or Seres 3 (Europe).

Fengon E3 EVR 
The EVR is the extended range hybrid version of the E3 with a 1.5 liter four-cylinder petrol engine delivering 50 kW combined with a three-phase asynchronous electric motor delivering 120 kW. The 1.5 engine acts as a generator to recharge the 17.28 kWh lithium-ion battery. The range in Full Electric mode is 100 km while in the hybrid mode with the 1.5 that powers the batteries, the range is 950 km. This version in China is sold as Seres ix3 (not to be confused with the BMW iX3).

References

External links
Official website

Fengon E3
2010s cars
Cars introduced in 2019
Production electric cars
Hybrid electric cars